Farwaniya Hospital is the main public general hospital in Al Farwaniyah Governorate, Kuwait.

New Farwaniya Hospital is new hospital which opened in 2022

Hospitals in Kuwait